Finny the Fish & the Seven Waters, known in Japan as , is an action game developed and published for PlayStation 2 by Sony Computer Entertainment Japan in Japan in 2004, and by Natsume in North America in 2005.

Reception

The game received "mixed" reviews according to the review aggregation website Metacritic. In Japan, however, Famitsu gave it a score of all four eights for a total of 32 out of 40.

References

External links
 

2004 video games
Action video games
Natsume (company) games
PlayStation 2 games
PlayStation 2-only games
Sony Interactive Entertainment games
Video games about animals
Video games developed in Japan
Video games with underwater settings